Wrocisławice  is a village in Lower Silesia, in the administrative district of Gmina Środa Śląska  within Środa Śląska County, Lower Silesian Voivodeship, in south-western Poland.

The beginnings of the village probably go back to the Middle Ages (the neighboring village of Bukówek was founded in 1282). The present church of St Lawrence was built in the first half of the 17th century and features an 18th-century altar painting of St Lawrence with a splendid polychrome wooden frame and a baroque painting of St Nicolaus.

References

External links
 The Parish Website (in Polish)
  General information about Lower Silesia from the State University of New York
 18th-century maps of Lower Silesian towns and villages from Topographia Seu Compendium Silesiae. Pars II by Friedrich Bernhard Wernher (website of Wratislaviae Amici)

Villages in Środa Śląska County